Timothy Scott (24 January 1895 – 1 May 1972) was an Irish hurler. He was a substitute on the Kilkenny senior hurling team that won the 1922 All-Ireland Championship.

Honours

Kilkenny
All-Ireland Senior Hurling Championship (1): 1922
Leinster Senior Hurling Championship (2): 1922, 1923

References

1895 births
1972 deaths
Kilkenny inter-county hurlers